Midnight Mutants is an action-adventure game for the Atari 7800 ProSystem, developed by Radioactive Software and published by Atari Corporation in 1990. It features a likeness of Al Lewis, dressed as Grandpa Munster, playing the role of "Grampa". The game, along with Sentinel, was one of the last releases by Atari for the Atari 7800.

As with similar games of that era, Midnight Mutants features a large in-game environment with many locations, a background musical soundtrack, battles against boss enemies and an animated introduction.

Plot 
On Halloween night in 1992 young Jimmy Harkman's grandfather (known as "Grampa") has been imprisoned inside of a pumpkin by a resurrected villain named Dr. Evil, who is taking revenge for being burned at the stake as a witch by their ancestor Johnathon Harkman on Halloween night in 1747.

Jimmy then heads on a Halloween quest to free his grandfather. With Doctor Evil on the loose, Jimmy finds the countryside has become inhabited by scary creatures such as zombies and werewolves that can injure him physically and also make his blood impure. Fortunately, even though Grampa is trapped in pumpkin form, he is available to give Jimmy advice on occasion with the push of a button. Along the way, Jimmy can collect weapons and items that will help him in his quest to defeat evil creatures, giant bosses and ultimately Dr. Evil himself.

Gameplay 

Midnight Mutants is a scrolling action-adventure game with a horror theme. It is displayed from a pseudo-isometric viewpoint and features a completely free-roaming world design.

In his quest to save Grandpa, Jimmy travels across the country side, exploring an old haunted mansion, a secret laboratory, caverns, a haunted forest, a pumpkin patch, a haunted graveyard, an old shipwreck, among other locations.

Initially, Jimmy is powerless to fight the evil that faces him and must rely on his wits and grandpa's advice in order to stay alive. Contact with the creatures roaming about will either cause him physical injury or make his blood lose its purity, both of which will prove fatal if he's not careful. As the game progresses, he locates various weapons of increasing power, health power-ups and other useful items that make it possible to defeat the minions of evil. Key parts of the game culminate in battles against giant boss creatures that take up most of the screen.

Reception 
In a retrospective review, Atari 7800 Forever gave the game a 4.5 out of 5, praising the humor, the approachable in-game menus and the excellent boss battles.

Reviews
Digital Press - Classic Video Games
The Video Game Critic
Defunct Games

References

External links
 Midnight Mutants at GameFAQs

1990 video games
Action-adventure games
Atari 7800 games
Atari 7800-only games
Atari games
Halloween video games
1990s horror video games
Video games set in 1992
Video games with oblique graphics
Video games developed in the United States
Single-player video games